Noah James Billingsley (born 6 August 1997), is a New Zealand professional footballer who plays as a fullback for the New Zealand national football team.

Club career
He played for UC Santa Barbara Gauchos.

He played for Minnesota United FC.

In 2021, Billingsley spent time on loan with USL Championship side Phoenix Rising FC.

On December 1, 2021, Minnesota United FC declined Billingsley's contract option.

International career
Billingsley made New Zealand football history when he scored New Zealand's first ever goal at a Men's U-20 World Cup in the team's 5–1 win over Myanmar.

Personal life
Billingsley attended Onslow College in Wellington before heading to America for university.

Career statistics

Club

International

References

External links

Noah Billingsley profile via Minnesota United FC
Noah Billingsley profile on UC Santa Barbara Gauchos men's soccer website.

1997 births
Living people
New Zealand association footballers
New Zealand expatriate association footballers
Expatriate soccer players in the United States
Association football defenders
Association footballers from Wellington City
UC Santa Barbara Gauchos men's soccer players
Minnesota United FC draft picks
Minnesota United FC players
Las Vegas Lights FC players
Phoenix Rising FC players
New Zealand international footballers
Major League Soccer players
USL Championship players